Allison Finney (born November 17, 1958) is an American professional golfer who played on the LPGA Tour.

Finney won once on the LPGA Tour in 1989.

Professional wins (1)

LPGA Tour wins (1)

References

External links

American female golfers
Stanford Cardinal women's golfers
LPGA Tour golfers
Golfers from Illinois
Golfers from California
Sportspeople from Evanston, Illinois
Sportspeople from Riverside County, California
People from Bermuda Dunes, California
1958 births
Living people
21st-century American women
20th-century American women